Statistics of the V-League in the 1999-00 season.

Standings

NOTE: Vinh Long's matches annulled.

References
 1999–2000 V-League at RSSSF

Vietnamese Super League seasons
Viet
1999 in Vietnamese football
2000 in Vietnamese football